is a Japanese television drama series that premiered on TV Asahi on 14 January 2016. It was previously aired as Saturday Night drama from 2013 to 2015. In this drama, Tsuyoshi Kusanagi, a member of SMAP, played the lead role, Kaho Minami, Yūta Hiraoka and Natsuna appeared in supporting roles. The first episode received a viewership rating of 17.1%, and its overall average was 12.0%. It was Sei Ashina’s final television role before her death in 2020.

Plot

In this drama series, Yoshito Takuma (Tsuyoshi Kusanagi) works together with his former team, consisting of Chinami Anekoji (Kaho Minami), Yuiko Matsubara (Sei Asahina), Kohei Horikawa (Yuta Hiraoka) and newcomer Maria Azuma (Natsuna Watanabe), to solve a variety of cases.

Cast
 Tsuyoshi Kusanagi as Yoshito Takuma
 Kaho Minami as Chinami Anekōji
 Yūta Hiraoka as Kōhei Horikawa
 Natsuna as Maria Azuma
 Sei Ashina as Yuiko Matsubara
 Masato Wada as Nozomu Nogata
 Mitsuru Fukikoshi as Hiroki Takidō

Episodes

References

External links
 
 

Japanese drama television series
2016 in Japanese television
2016 Japanese television series debuts
2016 Japanese television series endings
TV Asahi television dramas
Wrongful convictions in fiction
Television shows set in Kyoto
Tokyo Metropolitan Police Department in fiction